James Finley is the name of:

 James Finley (minister) (1725–1795), American Presbyterian minister
 James Finley (engineer) (1756–1828), pioneer suspension bridge builder
 James I. Finley, American politician
 James Bradley Finley (1781–1856), American clergyman

See also 
James Findlay (disambiguation)
James Finley Watson, American judge and politician